Svea Kristina Frisch (15 June 1898 in Ramsberg, Örebro county – 1991), known as Kristina Lindstrand, was a Swedish actor, journalist, author, and poet.

Her first marriage was during 1922–1927 with the actor and director Ivar Kåge, and the second (1929–1946) was with the painter Vicke Lindstrand. She moved from Sweden to Italy in 1969.

Filmography 
Där fyren blinkar (1924)

Bibliography 
Dagöppning (1942)
Gästspel (1943)
Kvinnan och hemmet (1951)
Pinbänken (1955)
Hemmet (1956)
Våra textilier (1957)
Flytta till solen (1960)
Pranzo (1960)
Soppa på solsken (1963)
Barfotamiljonären (1974)
Maria på Gedevik (1975)
Lyktdansen (1976)
Leva i Ligurien (1978)

References

1898 births
1991 deaths
Swedish film actresses
Swedish stage actresses
20th-century Swedish actresses
Swedish women novelists
20th-century Swedish women writers
Swedish-language writers
Swedish women poets